Tante Wanda aus Uganda ("Aunt Wanda from Uganda") is a 1957 West German comedy film directed by Géza von Cziffra and starring Grethe Weiser, Georg Thomalla and Lucie Englisch. The screenplay concerns a strong-willed woman who returns from Uganda and puts the lives of her family in order.

Cast
Grethe Weiser as Wanda Ramirez
Georg Thomalla as Jonas Edelmuth
Lucie Englisch as Rosa von Zeller
Ingmar Zeisberg as Lilli von Zeller
Rudolf Platte as Karl von Zeller
Eveline Bey
Al Hoosmann as Tarzan
Hans Jürgen Diedrich as Postman Müller
Franz-Otto Krüger as Detective
Bruno W. Pantel as Kampfveranstalter

References

Bibliography

External links

West German films
German comedy films
1957 comedy films
1950s German-language films
Films directed by Géza von Cziffra
UFA GmbH films
1950s German films